Turkey competed at the 2018 Winter Olympics in PyeongChang, South Korea, from 9 to 25 February 2018. The Turkish team consisted of eight athletes (five men and three women), competing in four sports, including ski jumping for the first time.

Competitors
The following is the list of number of competitors participating at the Games per sport/discipline.

Alpine skiing 

Turkey qualified two athletes, one male and one female.

Cross-country skiing 

Turkey qualified three athletes, two male and one female.

Distance

Sprint

Figure skating 

Turkey qualified one ice dancing pair (one male and one female), based on its placement at the 2017 World Figure Skating Championships in Helsinki, Finland.

Ski jumping  

Turkey qualified one male ski jumper. This will mark the country's Winter Olympics debut in the sport.

References

Nations at the 2018 Winter Olympics
2018
Winter Olympics